David McKey (born December 3, 1954) coached women's basketball at St. Edward's University (1984–1994) and Lamar University (1995-1998).  Coach McKey's teams at St. Edward's had the most wins in program history as of December 9, 2013 with a record of 220-79.  His Hilltopper teams played in two NAIA Final Fours, in three NAIA National Tournaments in addition to winning six conference championships and eight-straight winning seasons.  He received District Coach of the Year awards three times as well as Big State Conference Coach of the Year three times.  Coach McKey was awarded Sun Belt Conference Coach of the Year in his first season with the Lady Cardinals at Lamar University.

Head coaching record

References 

1954 births
Living people
Lamar Lady Cardinals basketball coaches
American women's basketball coaches